White snake, whitesnake or white serpent may refer to:

 Whitesnake, a British hard rock band
 White Snake (album), first solo album by David Coverdale (who later reused the name for his band Whitesnake, above), released in 1977
 Whitesnake (album) (also known as 1987 and Serpens Albus), a 1987 album by the band Whitesnake
 "Whitesnake", a song by the British band Late of the Pier from their 2008 album Fantasy Black Channel
 The White Snake, a German fairy tale included in Grimm's Fairy Tales
 Legend of the White Snake, a Chinese legend about a pair of ill-fated lovers
 White Snake (film), a 2019 animated fantasy film directed by Amp Wong and Zhao Ji
 Whitesnake, a Stand of Enrico Pucci, the main antagonist of Part 6 of the Japanese manga series JoJo's Bizarre Adventure